The 1990–91 Bundesliga was the 28th season of the Bundesliga, the premier football league in West Germany. It began on 8 August 1990 and ended on 15 June 1991. FC Bayern Munich were the defending champions.

With the Reunification of Germany on 3 October 1990, it was the last season that the league was exclusive to teams from the former West Germany before it was opened to teams from the former East Germany.

Competition modus
Every team played two games against each other team, one at home and one away. Teams received two points for a win and one point for a draw. If two or more teams were tied on points, places were determined by goal difference and, if still tied, by goals scored. The team with the most points were crowned champions while the two teams with the fewest points were relegated to 2. Bundesliga. The third-to-last team had to compete in a two-legged relegation/promotion play-off against the third-placed team from 2. Bundesliga.

Team changes to 1989–90
SV Waldhof Mannheim and FC Homburg were directly relegated to the 2. Bundesliga after finishing in the last two places. They were replaced by Hertha BSC and SG Wattenscheid 09. Relegation/promotion play-off participant VfL Bochum won on aggregate against 1. FC Saarbrücken and thus retained their Bundesliga status.

Team overview

 Wattenscheid played their first six home matches at Ruhrstadion because their own ground was upgraded to meet Bundesliga requirements.

League table

Results

Relegation play-offs
FC St. Pauli and third-placed 2. Bundesliga team Stuttgarter Kickers had to compete in a two-legged relegation/promotion play-off. After a two-leg series, both teams were tied 2–2 on aggregate, so a deciding third match had to be scheduled. Stuttgarter Kickers won this match and were promoted to the Bundesliga.

Top goalscorers
21 goals
  Roland Wohlfarth (FC Bayern Munich)

20 goals
  Jan Furtok (Hamburger SV)

16 goals
  Andreas Möller (Eintracht Frankfurt)

15 goals
  Thomas Allofs (Fortuna Düsseldorf)
  Wynton Rufer (SV Werder Bremen)

14 goals
  Maurice Banach (1. FC Köln)

13 goals
  Souleyman Sané (SG Wattenscheid 09)

12 goals
  Hans-Jörg Criens (Borussia Mönchengladbach)
  Fritz Walter (VfB Stuttgart)

11 goals
  Ulf Kirsten (Bayer 04 Leverkusen)
  Stefan Kohn (VfL Bochum)
  Stefan Kuntz (1. FC Kaiserslautern)
  Nando (Hamburger SV)
  Matthias Sammer (VfB Stuttgart)
  Rainer Schütterle (Karlsruher SC)

Champion squad

See also
 1990–91 2. Bundesliga
 1990–91 DFB-Pokal

References

External links
 DFB Bundesliga archive 1990/1991

Bundesliga seasons
1
Germany